Joseph Jesselli (born August 1949) is an American guitar maker and luthier currently living and working in East Northport, NY on Long Island. He has been making guitars since about 1978. He has been described as the “Stradivari of Huntington" by The New York Times. He is also the maternal uncle of Anthony Cumia, formerly of the Opie and Anthony radio show, and current host of The Anthony Cumia Show.

Joe Jesselli makes artisan quality electric hollow-body guitars. His instruments have distinct Art Deco and Art Nouveau influences. His guitars are owned by a number of notable musicians. A Jesselli "Rifle Guitar", owned by Keith Richards of The Rolling Stones, was once featured in Guitar World magazine.  Jesselli guitars were used to record "Undercover of the Night" and "Too Much Blood" from The Rolling Stones album Undercover.  Richards can be seen playing an electric Jesselli Archtop guitar in the music videos for those songs.

Jesselli was the only in-studio apprentice to Jimmy D'Aquisto, the  Huntington, NY luthier famous for elite arch-top type guitars popular among jazz musicians.  Jesselli worked in D'Aquisto's workshop for over six years, from 1973 until about 1980.  Prior to that, Jesselli apprenticed under Marcos Baiter, an Argentinian-born master wood carver and furniture maker who maintained a Long Island workshop in Huntington, NY.

Jesselli Guitars

Joseph Jesselli makes both acoustic and electric guitars.  Instruments can take months, or years, to complete depending upon numerous factors.  His instruments are known for both excellent tone as well as ornate design elements and superior quality.  Jesselli guitars are usually made to order and tend to cost over ten thousand dollars each. Instruments that are not made to order will be singular works of the maker's own exacting standards. With the exception of his first guitar, all Jesselli guitars are hollow-body. Even the electric guitars, which may look like solid body instruments, are in fact hollow.

The guitars can be very ornate and include many exotic materials, such as extinct mastodon tusk, Brazilian rosewood, ebony, Black Walnut, legally-sourced ivory and semi-precious gemstones such as jade.

Another aspect of Jesselli instruments that sets him apart is his penchant for designing and building most every component on the guitar.  Most makers are content to simply buy and install many of their parts.  On a Jesselli, the tuning machine buttons, truss rod cover, selector switch cap, pickup covers/mounting rings, volume and tone knobs, bridge, and tailpiece are all part of the canvas and therefore cannot be overlooked.  No expense in time or material cost is spared in creating even the most peripheral of components.  The maker views the instrument as more than just a tool for making music.  A Jesselli guitar is functional art.

Jesselli guitars are extremely rare.  The maker estimates he has made fewer than 120 guitars, as of 2011.  These are not production guitars, but unique handmade works of art.  If you come across one, refrain from modifying it beyond basic maintenance.  They are fine instruments, but foremost, each is a unique work of art and no two guitars are the same.  Even within model templates, rarely are the headstocks, inlay design, pickup, or Tone-wood choices the same.  Modifying a Jesselli guitar is akin to changing the colors on a rare painting, or taking a chisel to a sculpture.  If the tone of the instrument doesn't suit a musician, they are encouraged to sell the guitar, unmodified, or contact the maker directly.

About Jesselli's Pickups

The pickups in a Jesselli guitar are specified by Jesselli and are often custom made for him by Pete Biltoft, the owner of Vintage Vibe Guitars. Each set of pickups is chosen specifically to suit the particular instrument.  Jesselli believes that each guitar will have its own sound and requires a specific pickup to voice it properly. The very first guitar he made used Bartolini Hi A pickups with active electronics, long before anyone was using active circuitry.

He may also use pickups from the DiMarzio custom shop, Seymour Duncan custom shop, Ballurio Guitars, T.V. Jones, and Mayes Pickups.

Invariably, pickups will require custom work or modification prior to installation in a Jesselli guitar.  A pickup may be completely rewound with tapered wire or changed from a 2-wire to 3 or 4 wire configuration to alter the pickup sonically and to allow for additional tones when changing tone or volume controls or pickup switch positions.  Each pickup is also hand-fitted with a custom made leather cover.

References

External links 
 Jesselli-guitars.com
 Jesselli-guitars on Facebook
 Premiere Guitars
 Chitarre Accordo

1949 births
Living people
People from East Northport, New York
American luthiers